Obock is an impact crater  on Mars, within the Aeolis Dorsa on the edge of Elysium Planitia. The crater was named after the Obock Region, Djibouti, by the IAU in 2013.

References 

Impact craters on Mars